The Calgary Sun is a daily newspaper published in Calgary, Alberta, Canada. It is owned by Postmedia. First published in 1980, the tabloid-format daily replaced the long-running tabloid-size newspaper The Albertan soon after it was acquired by the publishers of the Toronto Sun. The newspaper, like most of those in the Canadian "Sun" chain, is known for short, snappy news stories aimed primarily at working-class readers. The Calgary Suns layout is based somewhat upon that of British tabloids.

History

The newspaper that would become the Calgary Sun was first published in 1886 as the Calgary Tribune.  Prior to its 1980 acquisition by Sun Media, it was published under the following titles:
1886-1895: Calgary Tribune
1895-1899: Alberta Tribune
1899: Albertan
1899-1902: Albertan and Alberta Tribune
1902-1920: Morning Albertan and Weekly Albertan
1920-1924: Morning Albertan and Western Farmer and Weekly Albertan
1924-1927: Calgary Albertan and Western Farmer and Weekly Albertan
1927-1936: Calgary Albertan
1936-1980: Albertan
1980: Calgary Albertan

Sunshine Girl

A signature feature of the Calgary Sun—as it is with the other Sun-branded newspapers in the chain—is a daily glamour photograph of a female model entitled the "Sunshine Girl". The feature utilizes locally photographed models (both amateur and professional) as well as photographs shot for the national chain. Originally situated on Page 3 (like the UK tabloids the Sun chain originally set out to emulate, which also featured glamour photos on their third pages), in the 1990s the feature was relocated to the Sports section. A "Sunshine Boy" feature appeared sporadically in the 1980s and 1990s.

Local weeklies
For many years, the Calgary Sun also published a local weekly, The Calgary Mirror, which covered community news; the Sun organization purchased the newspaper in the early 1990s. This publication, which originated in the 1950s and was also known at one time as North Hill News, was discontinued in 2001. It was succeeded by FYI Calgary In-Print, a free weekly newspaper intended to be a print equivalent of the Sun's much-publicized FYI Calgary news website (there was also an FYI Toronto newspaper published to tie-in with the Toronto Suns website). The new publication was rejected by readers and advertisers and was discontinued in May 2001 during a downsizing of Sun Media; the website abandoned the FYI concept about a year later and rebranded itself as Calgarysun.com.

Format
On October 2, 2006, the Sun underwent a major redesign, introducing a new logo (actually it finally adopted the logo used at several other Sun newspapers for several years previously), and revamping its typeface usage for both bodytext and headlines. In February 2007, Sun Media launched a Calgary edition of its free daily 24 Hours, which shares editors and editorial staff with the Calgary Sun. Sun Media ceased publishing the Calgary edition of 24 Hours in 2013.

Distribution
The Calgary Herald was produced on a daily basis up until 2012 when it ceased printing a Sunday edition. Distribution is done by subscription, direct sale (such as at newsstands), or by newspaper box. The latter was the target of public debate by City Council in early 2008 when at least one alderman claimed that newspaper boxes were responsible for increased states of litter on public transit.

 Circulation 
The Calgary Sun has seen like most Canadian daily newspapers a decline in circulation. Its total circulation dropped by  percent to 43,277 copies daily from 2009 to 2015.Daily average'''

Notable staff
 Hal Sigurdson, sports editor of The Albertan (1964 to 1966)

See also
 Ottawa Sun Toronto Sun Edmonton Sun Winnipeg Sun''
 List of newspapers in Canada

References

External links
 Calgary Sun

Newspapers published in Calgary
Postmedia Network publications
Publications established in 1980
Daily newspapers published in Alberta
1980 establishments in Alberta
Conservative media in Canada